Aloeides nubilus, the cloud copper, is a species of butterfly in the family Lycaenidae. It is endemic to South Africa, where it is found on low rocky ridges in the Mpumalanga Drakensberg.

The wingspan is 21–24 mm for males and 22–26 mm females. Adults are on wing from September to November. There is one generation per year.

References

Aloeides
Butterflies described in 1982
Endemic butterflies of South Africa
Taxonomy articles created by Polbot